Jump start or Jump Start may refer to:
Jump start (vehicle),  a method of starting an automobile
Jump start (motorsport)
Operation Jump Start

Arts and entertainment 
 Jump Start (comic strip), a daily comic strip by cartoonist Robb Armstrong
 "Jump Start", a song by Greg Howe from his 1993 album Introspection
 "Jump Start", a song by The Hang Ups that appeared in the 1997 film Chasing Amy
 "Jump Start", a song by Natalie Cole from her 1987 album Everlasting
 "Jump Start", a song by Jethro Tull on the album Crest of a Knave

Organizations 
 Jumpstart for Young Children, a nonprofit organization
 Jump$tart Coalition for Personal Financial Literacy, a non-profit organization
 Jumpstart (Jewish), a California organization

Technology 
 JumpStart, an educational software series
 JumpStart (Solaris), a computer network installation tool
 Jumpstart Technologies

Other uses 
 Jumpstart, a space mission of the United States Operationally Responsive Space Office

See also 
 Jumper (disambiguation)
 Jumper cable, electric cables which connect two rail or road vehicles